Saint-Sauveur or St Sauveur (French for "Holy Savior") may refer to:

Places

Canada
 Saint-Sauveur, New Brunswick
 Saint-Sauveur, Quebec
 Saint-Sauveur (electoral district), a former provincial electoral district in Quebec

France
 Saint-Sauveur, Hautes-Alpes, in the Hautes-Alpes department
 Saint-Sauveur, Côte-d'Or, in the Côte-d'Or department
 Saint-Sauveur, Dordogne, in the Dordogne  department
 Saint-Sauveur, Finistère, in the Finistère department
 Saint-Sauveur, Haute-Garonne, in the Haute-Garonne department
 Saint-Sauveur, Gironde, in the Gironde  department
 Saint-Sauveur, Île d'Yeu; see List of windmills in Vendée
 Saint-Sauveur, Isère, in the Isère department
 Saint-Sauveur, Meurthe-et-Moselle, in the Meurthe-et-Moselle department
 Saint-Sauveur, Oise, in the Oise department
 Saint-Sauveur, Haute-Saône, in the Haute-Saône department
 Saint-Sauveur, Somme, in the Somme  department
 Saint-Sauveur, Vienne, in the Vienne department
 Saint-Sauveur-Camprieu, in the Gard department
 Saint-Sauveur-d'Aunis, in the Charente-Maritime department
 Saint-Sauveur-de-Carrouges, in the Orne department
 Saint-Sauveur-de-Cruzières, in the Ardèche department
 Saint-Sauveur-de-Flée, in the Maine-et-Loire department
 Saint-Sauveur-de-Ginestoux, in the Lozère department
 Saint-Sauveur-de-Landemont, in the Maine-et-Loire department
 Saint-Sauveur-d'Émalleville, in the Seine-Maritime department
 Saint-Sauveur-de-Meilhan, in the Lot-et-Garonne department
 Saint-Sauveur-de-Montagut, in the Ardèche department
 Saint-Sauveur-de-Peyre, in the Lozère department
 Saint-Sauveur-de-Pierrepont, in the Manche department
 Saint-Sauveur-de-Puynormand, in the Gironde department
 Saint-Sauveur-des-Landes, in the Ille-et-Vilaine department
 Saint-Sauveur-en-Diois, in the Drôme department
 Saint-Sauveur-en-Puisaye, in the Yonne department
 Saint-Sauveur-en-Rue, in the Loire department
 Saint-Sauveur-Gouvernet, in the Drôme department
 Saint-Sauveur-Lalande, in the Dordogne department
 Saint-Sauveur-la-Pommeraye, in the Manche department
 Saint-Sauveur-la-Sagne, in the Puy-de-Dôme department
 Saint-Sauveur-la-Vallée, in the Lot department
 Saint-Sauveur-Lendelin, in the Manche department
 Saint-Sauveur-lès-Bray, in the Seine-et-Marne department
 Saint-Sauveur-le-Vicomte, in the Manche department
 Saint-Sauveur-Marville, in the Eure-et-Loir department
 Saint-Sauveur-sur-École, in the Seine-et-Marne department
 Saint-Sauveur-sur-Tinée, in the Alpes-Maritimes department
 Quartier Saint-Sauveur, a quarter of the city of Lille

Elsewhere
 Saint Sauveur, Dominica, a village in the Commonwealth of Dominica
 Saint-Sauveur, Wallonia, a district in Frasnes-lez-Anvaing, Hainaut, Belgium
 Saint-Sauveur, a commune of Guernsey

Other
 Abbey of Saint-Sauveur of Sarlat, France
 Aix Cathedral (Cathédrale Saint-Sauveur d'Aix-en-Provence),
 St Saviour's Cathedral, Cayenne (Cathédrale Saint-Sauveur de Cayenne)
 Saint-Sauveur, a medieval monastery and unidentified castle and lordship in Messenia, Greece
 Saint Sauveur Cathedral, a Melkite Greek Catholic cathedral in Montreal, Canada
 Melkite Greek Catholic Eparchy of Saint-Sauveur of Montréal, a Melkite Greek Catholic eparchy in Canada

See also
 Saint Savior (disambiguation)
 San Salvador (disambiguation)
 Sauveur (disambiguation)
 St Saviour's Cathedral (disambiguation)